Moore Peak is a peak rising to about  on the west slope of Mount Terror, Ross Island, Antarctica. At the suggestion of P.R. Kyle it was named by the Advisory Committee on Antarctic Names in 2000 after James A. Moore, a member of the New Mexico Institute of Mining and Technology team on Mount Erebus in the 1983–84 and 1985–86 field seasons. He completed his Master of Science thesis on the geology of Mount Erebus.

References

Mountains of Ross Island